Siaosi ʻAlipate Halakilangi Tau’alupeoko Vaea Tupou (15 May 1921 – 7 June 2009), more commonly known as Baron Vaea, was a Tongan politician who served as Prime Minister of Tonga. Vaea was a nephew of Queen Sālote, who ruled Tonga from 1918 until 1965, and a member of the Tongan nobility. His career in the Tongan government spanned 54 years.

Vaea was Prime Minister from 22 August 1991 until 2000 under the former King Taufa'ahau Tupou IV. He had previously served as Tonga's first High Commissioner to the United Kingdom from 1969 until 1972, as well as in various ministerial posts from 1972 until his appointment as Prime Minister by King Taufa'ahau Tupou IV in 1991.

The late Vaea and his wife, Baroness Tuputupu Vaea, are the parents of the current Queen of Tonga, Nanasipauʻu Tukuʻaho.

Biography

Early life
Siaosi ʻAlipate Halakilangi Tau’alupeoko Vaea Tupou was born on 15 May 1921 to parents Vīlai Tupou and Tupou Seini. His father, Vīlai Tupou, was the half brother of Queen Sālote, while his mother, Tupou Seini, was the daughter of a Tongan nobleman named Vaea. He attended Wesley College, Auckland, from 1938 until 1941. He enlisted in the Royal New Zealand Air Force following his graduation from high school and the outbreak of World War II. Vaea served as a pilot in the Air Force from 1942 until 1945 piloting PBY Catalina reconnaissance flying boats.

Government career
Vaea began working for the government of Tonga in January 1945 following his departure from the Royal New Zealand Air Force. He served his aunt, Queen Sālote, as Aide-de-Camp from 1953 until 1958.

He became the Governor of Ha'apai in 1960, a position he held until 1968. He became Tonga's first High Commissioner to the United Kingdom from 1969 until 1972. While High Commissioner he was given the title of Baron.

He was appointed to numerous government ministerial portfolios in the Tongan Cabinet beginning in 1972. Vaea was appointed as Tonga's first Minister of Labour and Commerce, and Industries, which he held from 1972 until 1991. As labour minister, Vaea was responsible for the construction of the Small Industries Centre in Ma'ufanga.

Vaea was simultaneously appointed Minister of Agriculture and Forestry in 1975, a position which he continued to hold until his official retirement from government in 2000. Additionally, Vaea also headed the Tongan Ministries of Civil Aviation, Tourism, Education and Marine and Ports, at various points during his career.

Prime Minister of Tonga
Baron Vaea applied for retirement from government and civil service in the early 1990s. However, soon after submitting his retirement application, King Tāufaʻāhau Tupou IV appointed Vaea as Prime Minister of Tonga. Vaea's predecessor, Fatafehi Tu'ipelehake had resigned from office in 1991 due to declining health. He took office on 22 August 1991, becoming the 12th Prime Minister of Tonga since 1876.

Vaea served as Prime Minister under King Taufa’ahau Tupou IV from 1991 and 2000. He attended the inaugural Pacific Alliance Leaders Meeting (PALM) in 1997, a gathering of Pacific Island Forum nations spearheaded by Japan to enhance cooperation between the Japanese and Pacific Islands governments. Each of Vaea's successors has attended following meetings since 1997.

Vaea's resignation from office was accepted by King Tupou in 2000, and Vaea was able to retire from government at the age of 78. With a career in the Tongan government and civil service spanning 54 years, Vaea remains one of Tonga's longest serving civil servants.

Later life
In an interview with Matangi Tonga during his retirement, Vaea expressed concern for a number of issues affecting Tonga, including the decreasing supplies of the country's fresh water supplies, the environment, the need for additional capital funds and the negative outlook of many Tongan young people. He also stated that the government should encourage Tongans to enter the business world. Vaea seemed to encourage progress and change in Tonga saying in the interview, "Sometimes I think it would be best if Tonga changed, . . . we should let go of some of our beliefs and the way that we do things that seem to weigh us down."

Death
Baron Vaea died at his residence, 'Tali ki Ha'apai', in Houma, Tongatapu, Tonga, on 7 June 2009, at approximately 10 pm He was 88 years old. Vaea had sought medical treatment in New Zealand, before returning to Tonga in late May 2009. He had been bedridden since May. Vaea's body was kept at his home in Houma until his funeral.

Baron Vaea was survived by his wife, Baroness Tuputupu Vaea, as well as five of their six children and one adopted daughter. The couple's children are HM Queen Nanasipauʻu Tukuʻaho, 'Alipate Tu'ivanuavou Vaea, 'Amelia Luoluafetu'u Vaea, Luseane Luani and Cassandra Tuku'aho (of Tu'ivanuavou Vaea). Vaea was predeased by two sons, Moimoikimofuta Kaifahina Vaea and Ratu Edward Vaea.

Vaea's funeral began at 11 am on 13 June 2009. A funeral procession commenced from his residence, called Tali ki Ha'apai, in Houma, to nearby Kolomanatau Cemetery for funeral ceremonies and burial.

Dignitaries in attendance included King George Tupou V, Princess Pilolevu Tuita and other members of the Tongan royal family. Several foreign heads of state also attended including the former O le Ao o le Malo of Samoa Tupua Tamasese Efi, his wife, Masiofo Filifilia Imo, and the then Fijian Vice President Ratu Epeli Nailatikau.

Tongan historian Elizabeth Wood-Ellem noted that Baron Vaea remained highly respected by the Tongan people throughout his life, "They certainly held him in enormous respect."

Succession
Baron Vaea's son ʻAlipate Tuʻivanuavou Vaea was bestowed the title Lord Vaea shortly after his father's death.

Family tree

Honours
National honours
  Order of Queen Sālote Tupou III, Grand Cross with Collar (31 July 2008).

References

External links
Baron Vaea – Daily telegraph obituary

Baron Vaea passes away after a long life of service
The Kingdom of Tonga Pays Tribute to its 12th Prime Minister, Baron Vaea of Houma (1921–2009)

1921 births
2009 deaths
Tongan nobles
New Zealand military personnel of World War II
Prime Ministers of Tonga
Agriculture ministers of Tonga
Forestry ministers of Tonga
Industry ministers of Tonga
Labour ministers of Tonga
Trade ministers of Tonga
Royal New Zealand Air Force personnel
Tongan aviators
Tongan World War II pilots
People educated at Wesley College, Auckland
High Commissioners of Tonga to the United Kingdom
People from Tongatapu
Knights Grand Cross of the Order of Queen Sālote Tupou III
Recipients of the Order of Tahiti Nui